Euphorbia heterochroma is a species of flowering plant in the family Euphorbiaceae.

References
Pax in H.G.A.Engler, Pflanzenw. Ost-Afrikas, C: 242 (1895).

heterochroma